Jukka Sinisalo (born 21 May 1982) is a Finnish football player who signed for Veikkausliiga side HIFK in early 2014. His position is central defender.
 Sinisalo began his career as a junior footballer in JPS and later in JJK. From JJK he transferred to VG-62 before moving to FC Inter of Turku. During his spell in Inter, he also made his debut in Veikkausliiga, the Finnish top level.

In early 2014, he signed a contract with HIFK that played in the second tier of Finnish football, Ykkönen, at the time being. Ever since then, Sinisalo has represented HIFK and was one of the key players during their successful season of 2014, after which HIFK got promoted back to the top flight, Veikkausliiga.

Playing style
Sinisalo is being described as being a defender upon whom the team can trust. His experience brings value to the team and his style to lead with example improves performances of his teammates.

Personal life
Sinisalo studies welfare technology and is a father.

References

1982 births
Living people
JJK Jyväskylä players
FC Inter Turku players
Veikkausliiga players
Finnish footballers
HIFK Fotboll players
Association football defenders
Sportspeople from Jyväskylä
21st-century Finnish people